The GE Dash 9-40C, also called a C40-9, was a  diesel locomotive that was built by GE Transportation Systems of Erie, Pennsylvania, between January 1995 and March 1995. The C40-9 was equipped with the 16-cylinder 7FDL-16 prime mover which is rated at a lower power than the  GE Dash 9-44CW that debuted a year earlier in 1994. It featured GE's direct current B13B traction motors.

The C40-9 featured the standard cab design and was the only model in the Dash-9 series to do so. It is essentially identical to the wide-cab C40-9W model otherwise.  All units had rooftop-mounted air conditioner units which gave them their distinct "top hat" look.

Norfolk Southern Railway (NS) was the only operator of this model. The company owns 125 units, numbered 8764–8888. NS specifically requested the standard cab and may have purchased more units had the Federal Railroad Administration not required it to purchase the wide-cab C40-9W version instead.

Upgrade
In mid 2015, NS started to upgrade its C40-9s into 4400 hp. C44-9s by upgrading the wattage to 3,281 kW, up from the as-delivered 3,000 kW. The units are being upgraded as they go in for their 184-day maintenance cycle.

Also in 2015, NS 8879 became first NS GE Dash 9-40C to be converted from DC to AC traction. The locomotive was rebuilt with a new GE wide nose and cab, and had locomotive speed limiter (LSL) and cab signals installed. These traction motor replacements are part of a Norfolk Southern / General Electric project to test the economic feasibility of converting Norfolk Southern's large (125 units), but relatively old Dash 9 fleet to AC traction. (BNSF Railway is also considering a similar upgrade program for its even bigger - originally 1797 units - C44-9W fleet). Work on the 8879 was sub-contracted out to and completed by American Motive Power, Inc. (AMP) in Dansville, NY. Two more units were soon added to the conversion program, NS C40-9 8799 and NS C40-9W 8900. 

As of 2022, all C40-9 units have been rebuilt.

References

Dash 9-40C
C-C locomotives
Diesel-electric locomotives of the United States
Freight locomotives
Norfolk Southern Railway locomotives
Standard gauge locomotives of the United States
Railway locomotives introduced in 1995